Los Angeles County Raceway (or "LACR") was a motorsport facility in Palmdale, California. LACR's main feature was its 1/4-mile dragstrip, which was first opened in 1964. LACR held its final event on July 29, 2007. The land under the track is owned by Granite Construction, Inc.

General information
Los Angeles County Raceway (LACR) was an NHRA-sanctioned quarter-mile drag strip located near East Avenue T and 70th Street east in Palmdale, California. LACR was home to many racing organizations such as SCEDA, NMRA, DHRA, ANRA, and practically every NHRA racing category. LACR was home to the annual Hangover Nationals, Fox Hunt, Rat Fink Party, and Toys for Tots. LACR was open every Wednesday and Friday night to any racer ranging from dragsters to street cars. LACR held its final race on the last weekend of July 2007, due to Granite Construction's ability to overtake the land they had leased to the raceway to use for mining.

Closing of LACR
LACR ceased operations on July 29, 2007. After 43 years, the mining company next door "Granite Construction", who leased the mineral rights to the property that was leased to LACR, shut down LACR in order for mining. Within 3 months of LACR closing its doors, every building on the property had been demolished, more than half the parking lot was mined, and no pavement remained.

In popular culture
 Los Angeles County Raceway has been seen in numerous movies and television shows. Hollywood movies featuring LACR include The Fast and the Furious and Ocean's Eleven.
 The Mariah Carey music video "Loverboy" was filmed at LACR.
 Mass media corporation Primedia has many of its automotive magazines based in their Los Angeles branch. Because of LACR's closeness to Los Angeles, many of these publications use Los Angeles County Raceway to perform comparison tests and to record performance data. Some of the magazines that frequent LACR are: Hot Rod Magazine; Four Wheeler, Sport Truck, Turbo, Car Craft Magazine; Chevy High Performance; 5.0 Mustang Magazine; Mustang Monthly Magazine; and Motorcyclist Magazine (all of their 1/4-mile data are recorded at LACR). Although separate from Primedia, Car and Driver magazine also stages many of its comparison tests at Los Angeles County Raceway (acceleration data) as well as neighboring Willow Springs Raceway (handling data).
 LACR's list of films, videos, television shows, and magazines that use Los Angeles County Raceway.

See also
LACR picture gallery

References

External links

SaveLACR.org-LACR's past, present, and future.

Buildings and structures in Palmdale, California
Defunct drag racing venues
Motorsport venues in California
Defunct motorsport venues in the United States
Sports venues in Greater Los Angeles
Sports venues completed in 1964
1964 establishments in California
2007 disestablishments in California